{{Infobox person
| name               = Angela Kang
| image              = Angela Kang by Gage Skidmore.jpg
| alt                = 
| caption            = Kang at the 2018 San Diego Comic-Con
| birth_name         = 
| birth_date         = 
| birth_place        = Irvine, California, U.S.
| nationality        = American
| other_names        = 
| known_for          = TerriersThe Walking Dead
| occupation         = Television writer  Showrunner
}}

Angela Kang (born March 23, 1976) is an American television writer known for serving as showrunner on the AMC horror drama series The Walking Dead for the final three seasons.

 Early life 
Kang was born and raised in Irvine, California, the daughter of working-class Korean immigrants. She received a Bachelor of Arts in English and Theater from Occidental College in Los Angeles, California in 1998, after which she had several short stories and poems published, and also wrote a number of plays. She eventually returned to school where she received a Master of Fine Arts degree in screenwriting from the University of Southern California where she was the recipient of the Annenberg Graduation Fellowship.

 Television career 
Her first job in the television industry came when she worked as an intern for the ABC medical drama series Grey's Anatomy and Private Practice. Her first job as a staff writer was for the unaired NBC post-apocalyptic series Day One, which she got coming out of graduate school. Shortly thereafter, she was hired as a staff writer on the short-lived FX series Terriers, of which she wrote two episodes. In 2011, she joined the writing staff of the acclaimed AMC horror drama series The Walking Dead as a story editor for season two. She was promoted to producer for season three (2012–2013), co-executive producer for season five (2014–2015), and showrunner for seasons nine through eleven (2018–2022).

In addition to working on The Walking Dead and other shows, Kang also starred on the Talking Dead, a talk show talking about The Walking Dead and Fear the Walking Dead (2011–2019). She also wrote the short films Slow Pitch in Relief (2009) and Harlequin (2004).

Following the conclusion of the 11th and final season of The Walking Dead'', Kang was set to become the showrunner of a spin-off series focused on Daryl Dixon (Norman Reedus) and Carol Peletier (Melissa McBride) set to air in 2023. In April 2022, she exited the project as showrunner, but remained as an executive producer.

Works

Terriers 
 Staff Writer – 12 Episodes (2010)
 Writer – 2 Episodes (2010)

The Walking Dead 
 Producer – 32 Episodes (2012–2014)
 Co-Executive Producer – 64 Episodes (2014–2018)
 Executive Producer – 62 Episodes (2018–2022)
 Writer – 28 Episodes (2011–2021)
 Story Editor – 13 Episodes (2011–2012)
 Story by – 2 Episode (2017-2022)
 Teleplay by – 1 Episode (2017)

Terriers episodes 
 1.06 – "Ring-a-Ding-Ding"
 1.12 – "Quid Pro Quo" (co-written with Leslye Headland)

The Walking Dead episodes 
 2.06 – "Secrets"
 2.11 – "Judge, Jury, Executioner"
 3.05 – "Say the Word"
 3.11 – "I Ain't a Judas"
 4.02 – "Infected"
 4.12 – "Still"
 4.16 – "A" (co-written with Scott M. Gimple)
 5.03 – "Four Walls and a Roof" (co-written with Corey Reed)
 5.08 – "Coda"
 5.15 – "Try"
 6.03 – "Thank You"
 6.10 – "The Next World" (co-written with Corey Reed)
 6.13 – "The Same Boat"
 7.03 – "The Cell"
 7.07 – "Sing Me a Song" (co-written with Corey Reed)
 7.09 – "Rock in the Road"
 7.14 – "The Other Side"
 7.16 – "The First Day of the Rest of Your Life" (co-written with Scott M. Gimple and Matthew Negrete)
 8.05 – "The Big Scary U" (co-written with Scott M. Gimple and David Leslie Johnson)
 8.06 – "The King, the Widow, and Rick" (co-written with Corey Reed)
 8.08 – "How It's Gotta Be" (co-written with David Leslie Johnson)
 8.10 – "The Lost and the Plunderers" (co-written with Channing Powell and Corey Reed)
 8.13 – "Do Not Send Us Astray" (co-written with Matthew Negrete)
 8.16 – "Wrath" (co-written with Scott M. Gimple and Matthew Negrete)
 9.01 – "A New Beginning"
 9.16 – "The Storm" (co-written with Matthew Negrete)
 10.01 – "Lines We Cross"
 11.01 – "Acheron: Part I" (co-written with Jim Barnes)
 11.02 – "Acheron: Part II" (co-written with Jim Barnes)
 11.24 – "Rest in Peace" (story)

References

External links 
 
 

American television writers
Occidental College alumni
USC School of Cinematic Arts alumni
American women television writers
Living people
Place of birth missing (living people)
Television producers from California
American women television producers
People from Irvine, California
American writers of Korean descent
Screenwriters from California
Showrunners
1976 births
21st-century American screenwriters
21st-century American women writers